The 1931 Barcelona City Council election was held on Sunday, 12 April 1931, to elect the Barcelona City Council, the unicameral local legislature of the municipality of Barcelona. This was the first election under the Dictatorship of Primo de Rivera. At stake were all 50 seats in the City Council, determining the Mayor of Barcelona. The election was perceived as a plebiscite on Spanish Monarchy. The results lead to the Second Spanish Republic.

Electoral system
The number of seats of each council was determined by the population count. According to the 1877 municipal law, the population-seat relationship on each municipality was to be established on the following scale:

The 1907 election law established that councillors should be elected in districts consisting of 4 members, although 3 to 7 member districts were also allowed. Voters had to choose multiple candidates using limited voting, which allows a voter to vote for fewer candidates than members have to be elected. Candidates winning a plurality of votes in each district were elected. If the number of candidates was equal or fewer than the number of seats to be filled, candidates were automatically proclaimed without an election.
Voting was compulsory, but not enforced, and on the basis of universal manhood suffrage, with males over twenty-five and at least a two-year residency in a municipality required to vote.
Mayors were elected indirectly by the city or town council on the first session after the election.

Results

Results by district

Councillors elected
Republican Left of Catalonia (ERC-USC)
Jaume Aguadé i Miró  
Amadeu Aragay i Daví  
Josep Armengol de Llano  
Josep Bertran de Quintaua  
Rafael Campalaus i Puig  
Joan Casanellas    
Joan Casanovas i Maristany  
Pere Comas i Calvet  
Lluís Companys i Jover  
Francesc Costa i Martin  
Josep Duran i Guàrdia  
Josep Escofet i Andreu  
Joan Lluhí i Vallescà  
Ramon Marlés i Fanés  
Miquel Ollé i Jové  
Domènec Pla i Blanco  
Lluís Puig i Monné  
Enric Sànchez i Silva  
Jaume Vàchier i Pallé  
Salvador Vallverdú i Parxachs  
Joaquim Ventalló i Vergés  
Ernest Ventós i Casadevall  
Antoni Vilalta i Vidal  
Jaume Vinyals i Garrich  
Joaquim Xirau i Palau
Regionalist League (LR)
Josep Alomar i Estadas  
Frederic Amat i Arnau  
Joan Antoni Güell i Lòpez 
Andreu Bausili i Sanromà  
Frederic Brasó i Villaret  
Josep Cabré i Gelabert  
Martí Casals i Galceran  
Ferran de Sagarra i de Castellarnau
Amadeu Llopart i Vilalta  
Josep Nonell i Pujol  
Joaquim Pellicena i Camacho  
Francesc Puig i Alfonso  
 Republican-Socialist Coalition (PRR-PSOE)
Felip de Solà i Cañizares 
Joan Domènech i Buscà  
Casimir Giralt i Bullich  
Joan Grisó i Descàrrega  
Frederic Herèdia i Valls  
Pere Huguet i Puigderrajols  
Josep Jové i Sarroca  
Mateu Ruiz i Morlan  
Pere Salvat i Pie  
Josep Samblancat i Salanova  
Jesús Ulled i Altemir 
Abel Velilla i Sarazola  
Autonomous Republican (Rep.A)
Manuel Santamaria i Gonzàlez

References

1931
1930s in Barcelona
1931 in Catalonia
April 1931 events